Mazama Glacier is located on the southeast slopes of Mount Adams a stratovolcano in the U.S. state of Washington. Mazama Glacier is in the Yakama Indian Reservation. Mazama Glacier has been in a general state of retreat for over 100 years and lost 46 percent of its surface area between 1904 and 2006.

Originally known as Hell-roaring Glacier, the name was changed in 1895 by a group from the Mazamas club while they were on their second annual outing.

See also 
List of glaciers in the United States

References 

Glaciers of Mount Adams (Washington)
Mount Adams (Washington)
Gifford Pinchot National Forest
Glaciers of Yakima County, Washington
Glaciers of Washington (state)